The general election was held on November 3, 2020, to elect a member of the United States Senate to represent the State of Wyoming, concurrently with the 2020 U.S. presidential election, as well as other elections to the United States Senate in other states and elections to the United States House of Representatives and various state and local elections. The Democratic and Republican party primary election will be held on August 18, 2020.

President of the United States 

The 2020 United States presidential election in Wyoming took place on Tuesday, November 3, 2020, as part of the 2020 United States presidential election in which all 50 states plus the District of Columbia participated. Wyoming voters chose electors to represent them in the Electoral College via a popular vote. The state of Wyoming has 3 electoral votes in the Electoral College, and was won by incumbent Republican President Donald Trump.

Statewide results

United States Class II Senate Seat 

The 2020 United States Senate election in Wyoming will be held on November 3, 2020, to elect a member of the United States Senate to represent the State of Wyoming, concurrently with the 2020 U.S. presidential election, as well as other elections to the United States Senate in other states and elections to the United States House of Representatives and various state and local elections. Incumbent Republican Mike Enzi is not running for reelection. The Democratic and Republican party primary election was held on August 18, 2020.

Republican primary

Democratic primary

General election

United States House of Representatives 

The 2020 United States House of Representatives election in Wyoming will be held on November 3, 2020, to elect the U.S. representative from Wyoming's at-large congressional district. The elections will coincide with the 2020 U.S. presidential election, as well as other elections to the House of Representatives, elections to the United States Senate and various state and local elections.

Republican primary

Democratic primary

General election

State Legislature 
The state legislative elections resulted in a rightward shift in both the House and Senate.

Wyoming Senate

Of the 30 seats in the Wyoming Senate, 15 were up for election in 2020.

Wyoming House of Representatives

All 60 seats in the Wyoming House of Representatives were up for election in 2020.

Supreme Court

Boomgaarden's seat

Gray's seat

References

External links
 
 
  (State affiliate of the U.S. League of Women Voters)
 

 
Wyoming judicial elections
Wyoming